The Journal of Sex Education and Therapy is the official academic journal of the American Association of Sexuality Educators, Counselors, and Therapists.

Sexology journals
Quarterly journals
English-language journals
Sex education